Tharwat or Sarwat (Arabic or Urdu: ثروت) is an Asian name derived from the Arabic word (tharwa ثروة) means treasure, that may refer to
Given name
Tharwat Abaza (1927–2002), Egyptian journalist and novelist 
Tharwat Alhajjaj, Paralympic weightlifter from Jordan 
Tharwat Bassily, Egyptian businessman
Tharwat Bendary (born 1970), Egyptian weightlifter
Sarwat Gilani (born 1982), Pakistani model and film, television and voice actress 
Sarwat Nazir, Pakistani fiction and screen writer
Tharwat Okasha (born 1921), Egyptian writer, translator and government official 

Surname
Abdel Khalek Sarwat Pasha (1873–1928), Egyptian politician 
Zubaida Tharwat (1940–2016), Egyptian film, stage and television actress

See also
Servet, the Turkish and Albanian form of Tharwat

Arabic-language surnames